Marvin Hemmings, also known as Toneworld, is an American songwriter, producer, and pianist, best known for his work alongside producer Rodney Jerkins, as well as producing Top 10 gospel single "Withholding Nothing" by William McDowell. Hemmings has written and produced for Justin Bieber, Brandy, and others, and has also composed music for Empire and The High Note.

Songwriting, piano and production credits

Awards and nominations

References 

1979 births
African-American songwriters
Living people